PCCP may refer to:
Physical Chemistry Chemical Physics, a scientific journal
From Potential Conflict to Cooperation Potential within the International Hydrological Programme of the UNESCO
 Prestressed concrete cylinder pipe

See also
 PCC(p)